Mitcham railway station is located on the Lilydale and Belgrave lines in Victoria, Australia. It serves the eastern Melbourne suburb of Mitcham, and it opened on 25 December 1882.

History

Mitcham station opened on 25 December 1882, just over three weeks after the line from Camberwell was extended to Lilydale. Like the suburb itself, the station was named after a farm property, "Mitcham Grove", owned by Wiliam Slater, a local who grew roses and herbs. Another theory is that Mitcham was named after a property, "Mitcham Heights", itself named after Mitcham, Surrey, England.

In 1953, flashing light signals were provided at the former Mitcham Road level crossing, which was located at the Down end of the station.

Until the 1970s, a shunting yard and goods shed existed where the southern car park exists today. Tracks remained embedded in the car park surface of that time, enabling parking for the great majority of the time when trains did not use the yard. In 1979, the station was one of three used as trial sites for new bike lockers under the Melbourne Bicycle Strategy, either for occasional, monthly or quarterly hire. Also in that year, boom barriers were provided at the former level crossing. By 1985, goods services to and from the station ceased.

In 1989, the former ground level station buildings were provided, when the former signal box was relocated into the new building. On 4 April 1996, Mitcham was upgraded to a Premium Station.

On 2 January 2014, the original ground level station closed, as part of the grade separation project to replace the Mitcham Road and Rooks Road level crossings. It was replaced by a new below-ground station that opened on 25 January of that year.

Until their removal due to the level crossing removals, a crossover and siding were located at the Up end of the station.

Mitcham was due to receive an upgraded commuter car park, following a 2019 commitment by the federal government. However, this was scrapped in 2021.

Facilities, platforms and services

Mitcham has two side platforms with a concourse above on ground level. The concourse features a customer service window, an enclosed waiting room, toilets and a café. Access to the platforms is provided by stairs, lifts and ramps.

The station is serviced by Metro Trains' Lilydale and Belgrave line services.

Platform 1:
  all stations and limited express services to Flinders Street
  all stations and limited express services to Flinders Street

Platform 2:
  all stations services to Lilydale
  all stations services to Belgrave

Transport links

Kinetic Melbourne operates four routes via Mitcham station, under contract to Public Transport Victoria:
 : to Box Hill station
 : to Ringwood station
  : Frankston station – Melbourne Airport
  : to Lonsdale Street (Melbourne CBD)

Ventura Bus Lines operate four routes to and from Mitcham station, under contract to Public Transport Victoria:
 : to Blackburn station
 : to Westfield Knox
 : to Vermont East
 : to Box Hill station

Gallery

References

External links
 
 Melway map at street-directory.com.au

Premium Melbourne railway stations
Railway stations in Melbourne
Railway stations in Australia opened in 1882
Railway stations in the City of Whitehorse